On (and off) The Road (1981–1984) is the sixth of the major box set releases from English progressive rock group King Crimson, released in 2016 by Discipline Global Mobile & Panegyric Records.

Across 11 CDs, 3 Blu-ray audio and video discs, 3 DVD-As and 2 DVDs is a limited edition box set featuring studio and live recordings – many previously unreleased – from King Crimson's 1980's live line-up.

It includes the 2011 stereo and 5.1 surround mixes of Discipline, with the 2016 stereo and 5.1 surround mixes of Beat and Three of a Perfect Pair by Steven Wilson and Robert Fripp.

Track listing

References

External links 

 
 
 

King Crimson albums
2016 albums
Discipline Global Mobile albums